The Heihe–Tengchong Line, also called the Aihui-Tengchong Line (and internationally as the Hu line), is an imaginary line that divides the area of China into two parts with contrasting population densities. It stretches from the city of Heihe in northeast to Tengchong in south, diagonally across China. The eastern portion, area shown in red in the map, is further subdivided into north and south halves.

As of 2015, 94% of China's population live east of the line, in an area that is 43% of China's total, whereas 57% of the Chinese territory is west of the line has but only 6% of the country's population.

History 

Chinese population geographer Hu Huanyong imagined the line in 1935 and called it a "geo-demographic demarcation line". As this line was proposed in 1935, the map of China at the time included Mongolia (whose independence China did not recognise until after WWII) but excluded Taiwan (which was a colony of Japan at the time).

Demographic trend

1935 statistics 

This imaginary line divides the territory of China as follows (going by 1935 statistics):

 West of the line (including Mongolia): 64% of the area, but only 4% of the population (1935)
 East of the line: 36% of the area, but 96% of the population (1935)

2002 and 2015 statistics 

Despite a large scale urban migration mainly towards coasts but also trending south, 2002 and 2015 statistics remain nearly identical vis-à-vis the line:

 West of the line: 57% of the area, but only 6% of the population (2002)
 East of the line: 43% of the area, but 94% of the population (2002)

The major change in area between 1935 to 2015 is attributed to the acknowledge of the independence of Mongolia by China after the Yalta Conference. The minor change in total population percent from 1935 to 2015 is attributed to Han Chinese migration to urban areas west of the line, as well as one-child policy restrictions on the majority, with exceptions for largely-minority groups west of the line. However, during the 2000-2015 period, population in the west of the line indeed grew faster than the east, but the growth was not sufficient to budge the rounded percentages.  Most of this growth was contained in the cities of Ürümqi, Lanzhou, Ordos, and Yinchuan, although some tribal non-city areas also registered high growth.

Present statistics

See also 

 Qinling–Huaihe Line, further subdivides eastern China in northern and southern halves
 Physiographic macroregions of China
 China Proper

References

External links 

 Great Circle Mapper
 Numerical Simulation of Population Distribution in China
 Hu Line: Journey Through China's Heartland

Cultural boundaries
Geography of China